Dr. Terrance Thirteen (sometimes Terrence), known simply as Doctor Thirteen, Dr. 13 and The Ghost-Breaker, is a fictional character in comic books set in the DC Universe. The character's first published appearance is in Star Spangled Comics #122 (November 1951).

Publication history
Dr. Thirteen, also known as Dr. Thirteen the Ghost Breaker, debuted in his own feature in Star Spangled Comics, from issue #122–130 (Nov. 1951 – July 1952). The feature then moved to House of Mystery and was canceled after issue #7. The character was created by an unknown writer with artist Leonard Starr.

The character next appeared in Showcase #80 in 1969 as a supporting character in the Phantom Stranger story and then as a regular character in the Phantom Stranger series that began later that year. Early issues featured a few new pages of story and art that framed reprints of the two characters' old stories. The feature was temporarily replaced by The Spawn of Frankenstein in Phantom Stranger #23–30, in which Dr. Thirteen appeared, blaming Frankenstein's monster for putting his wife, Maria, in a coma. He made one further appearance in issue #36, replacing the Black Orchid serial that had replaced The Spawn of Frankenstein. He also had a serial in Ghosts #95–99 and #101-102. In three of these issues, he confronted the Spectre. He also appeared in House of Secrets #150 alongside his longtime rival, the Phantom Stranger.

Dr. Thirteen also appeared in Batman #341–342 (November–December 1981) to research a mystery in the abandoned Wayne Manor involving the Man-Bat. He reappeared in Gotham City in Batman #354 (December 1982) to reluctantly aid Rupert Thorne, who believed that he was being haunted by the ghost of Hugo Strange.

Fictional character biography

Pre-Crisis
Dr. Thirteen is a parapsychologist who investigates reports of possible supernatural activity with the goal of proving them to be hoaxes. Dr. Thirteen's stories are set in the DC Universe, where many stories involving the supernatural also are set. He was usually accompanied by his wife, Maria, sometimes called Marie.

In his origin story, as presented in Showcase #80, Terrence's [sic—the spelling varied, but it was spelled with an e in the first story] father tries to hide his ancestry from him, but eventually went into a locked room, showing his son the history of his ancestors, many of whom were executed for practicing magic, such as Daniel, who was killed by the ancient Romans for diagramming the solar system, and Rebecca, who was executed during the Salem witch trials, when she was actually developing anesthesia. Terry and his unnamed father enter into a pact to prove that the supernatural is false by determining things that Mr. Thirteen will say to Terry by the grandfather clock on the one-year anniversary of his death. Mr. Thirteen is then killed in a road accident three months later. On the first anniversary of his father's death, Terry asks the questions and gets no response, then remembers that he was supposed to set the clock before asking the questions. At this point, he hears the correct responses to the questions. He discovers that these responses are on a gramophone record that was planted by his fiancée, Marie, who also had a pact with Mr. Thirteen to show Terry that anything that appears to be supernatural has a rational explanation.

Post-Crisis
In the limited series The Books of Magic, John Constantine explains to Timothy Hunter that because Dr. Thirteen does not believe, magic and the supernatural truly do not work for him.

Vertigo Visions
In the Vertigo Comics one-shot Vertigo Visions: Doctor 13 – Do AIs Dream of Electric Sheep?, Dr. Terrence Thirteen and his wife Marie go to marriage counseling, as Marie is becoming increasingly alienated from Terrence due to his overbearing behavior and the fact that he refuses to take payment for his services and therefore lives off her bank account. Dr. Thirteen becomes trapped in a virtual reality and embroiled in a conflict between benign and malicious artificial intelligences with the ability to manipulate media and sensory perceptions on a global scale. At the conclusion of the comic, Dr. Thirteen is seen in a mental institution, having apparently suffered a mental breakdown during the visit to the marriage counselor and hallucinated everything, although the AIs are also seen to be real.

Seven Soldiers of Victory
In the first issue of Grant Morrison's Seven Soldiers: Zatanna miniseries, Dr. Thirteen is said to have been dating the title character, believing her to be just a very talented stage magician. After she attends his book signing, he agrees to go with her to obtain proof that magic is real. Joined by Ibis the Invincible, his wife Taia, and Swamp Thing supporting character Timothy Ravenwind, the group journey to many mystical realms. The purpose is to hunt for an approaching magical threat. Thirteen and the other three mystics are skeletonized by an entity called Gwdion. Zatanna blames her lack of preparation for the mystical journey, along with her addiction to using magic for selfish purposes.

Tales of the Unexpected
In the eight-issue miniseries Tales of the Unexpected published in 2006, Dr. Thirteen unites with other characters from cancelled series, including Genius Jones, Andrew Bennett, Anthro, the Primate Patrol, Infectious Lass from the Legion of Substitute-Heroes, Captain Fear from a 1970s feature within the pages of Adventure Comics, and the Haunted Tank, in a story that repeatedly breaks the fourth wall and comments on the then-current state of DC Comics and its continuity. Dr. Thirteen's group fights the Architects, the four writers who were heavily involved in the direction of the DC Universe titles at the time — Geoff Johns, Grant Morrison, Greg Rucka and Mark Waid — to convince them to include them in the new Universe. The story ends with Dr. Thirteen warning his companions and the readers of a new danger.

Post-Infinite Crisis, Dr. Thirteen lives with his daughter Traci Thirteen in Doomsbury Mansion, still working as a paranormal investigator. Traci is a sorceress, a fact that he finds most upsetting.

Flashpoint
In the alternate timeline of the Flashpoint event, Dr. Thirteen was rescued from Paris before its destruction by his daughter, and is a member of the H.I.V.E., who vote on using nuclear weapons to end the Atlantean/Amazonian threat in Western Europe. When Traci tries to stop this, he injects her with a drug and proceeds to start the countdown. Traci teleports away to find help. When she returns to face her father without the desired help, she discovers that he had learnt the art of black magic, which he uses to attack her. During the battle, Traci teleports herself to Paris, showing her father that, if the nuclear weapons are used, then she will die, along with 118 million people. She becomes badly injured from an Amazon spear. This snaps Dr. Thirteen out of his rampage. The two reconcile and Dr. Thirteen uses his remaining magic to stop the satellite, less than two minutes before it attacks. Traci then saves him, and it is revealed they have both used up all of their magic.

The New 52
Following the events of Flashpoint, Dr. Thirteen appeared in a two-part backup story in All-Star Western #11-12. In this rebooted version, he lives in 1880s Gotham City, where he is enlisted by the police to hunt down a paranormal highwayman. Dr. Thirteen's descendant (also named Dr. Terrance Thirteen) later appears in The Phantom Stranger (vol. 4) #2, enlisting the aid of the Phantom Stranger to repel the Haunted Highwayman in the present time. Dr. Terrance is killed by Nimraa's minion, Zalkoat, while hunting down the Phantom Stranger. While battling Phantom Stranger, Zalkoat states that Terrance's soul is trapped in its sword. Phantom Stranger revives Terrance by stabbing the latter's body with Zalkoat's sword.

Other versions
Grant Morrison, in Doom Patrol (vol. 2) #54 substituted him in Danny the Street's dreams with Doctor Occult in a superhero version of The Trenchcoat Brigade in which Constantine uses "Hellblazer" as a superhero name. That version of the character was "the Multiple Man" rather than the Ghost-Breaker, of which his Dr. 8 identity was second most important to the story.

References

External links
 
 
 Doctor Thirteen at the DCU Guide

Comics characters introduced in 1951
DC Comics fantasy characters
DC Comics male superheroes
DC Comics scientists
DC Comics superheroes
DC Comics titles
Fictional characters with anti-magic or power negation abilities
Fictional occult and psychic detectives
Fictional parapsychologists

de:Phantom Stranger#Doctor Thirteen